Guttau, in Sorbian Hućina, is a village and a former municipality in the east of Saxony, Germany. It belongs to the district of Bautzen and lies northeast of the eponymous city. Since 1 January 2013, it is part of the municipality Malschwitz.

Geography 
The municipality was situated in the Upper Lusatian plain, south of the so-called Lusatian Lake District. The villages of Halbendorf, Lömischau, Lieske and Neudorf lie along the river Spree.

Villages 
Several villages belonged to the municipality:

 Brösa (Brězyna),
 Guttau (Hućina),
 Halbendorf/Spree (Połpica),
 Kleinsaubernitz (Zubornička),
 Lieske (Lěskej),
 Lömischau (Lemišow),
 Neudorf/Spree (Nowa Wjes/Sprjewja),
 Ruhethal (Wotpočink),
 Wartha (Stróža).

References 

Former municipalities in Saxony
Populated places in Bautzen (district)